David John Ryall (5 January 1935 – 25 December 2014) was an English stage, film and television character actor. He had leading roles in Lytton's Diary and Goodnight Sweetheart, as well as memorable roles in Dennis Potter's The Singing Detective and Andrew Davies's adaptation of To Play the King. He also portrayed Billy Buzzle in the ITV sitcom Bless Me, Father and Frank in the BBC sitcom Outnumbered.

Early life
Born in Shoreham-by-Sea, Sussex, Ryall was educated at Shoreham and Wallington grammar schools. He received a scholarship to the Royal Academy of Dramatic Art in 1962; during which time he won the Caryl Brahms Award for a Musical.

Career
On leaving RADA, he went into repertory theatre in Salisbury, Bristol, Leicester and Birmingham (including King Lear and The Master Builder) and then into Laurence Olivier's company with the National Theatre at the Old Vic from 1965 to 1973. During this time he was involved with many new and influential plays, including Tom Stoppard's Rosencrantz and Guildenstern are Dead and Jumpers, Peter Shaffer's The Royal Hunt of the Sun and Adrian Mitchell's Tyger. Other work at the National Theatre included Guys and Dolls, The Beggar's Opera, Coriolanus (for which he won the Clarence Derwent Award in 1985) and Animal Farm,  The School for Wives, Wild Oats, Democracy and The UN Inspector. In 1979 Ryall played a small role as a mechanic in the episode, Earnshaw Strikes Back, in the long running BBC series Last of the Summer Wine.  In 1983 he worked on 'A Matter of the Officers' and Jean Seberg with Julian Barry, who remained a lifelong friend. In 1984 Ryall performed a one-man show of stories and poems by Edward Bond at the NT, entitled A Leap in the Light.

Ryall portrayed discredited scientist Frank Skuse in the March 1990 docudrama, Who Bombed Birmingham?

In 1994 he played Feste in Sir Peter Hall's production of Twelfth Night – a performance which was praised highly by Sir Alec Guinness in his autobiography. In 1996–97, working with the Royal Shakespeare Company, he played God in The Mysteries, and Polonius in Hamlet, for which he was nominated for the Helen Hayes Award during its tour of the United States.

He worked with Sir Peter Hall again in the 1999 production of Lenny in the West End, and after that in the 2000 epic Tantalus, in Colorado and the UK. Ryall continued to be a regular face in the theatre: with appearances in Patrick Marber's Don Juan in Soho at the Donmar Warehouse in 2007.

His television and film career included The Knowledge, The Singing Detective, Shelley, Inspector Morse, Doc Martin, Midsomer Murders,Bertie and Elizabeth, Juliet Bravo, Down to Earth (2000 TV series), Foyle's War,  Plotlands, State of Play, The Elephant Man, Truly, Madly, Deeply, Black Beauty and Two Men Went to War. He appeared as Max, an antiques collector, in episode 4 of BBC drama Bonekickers.

In 2005, Ryall played the role of Winston Churchill in the French television drama Le Grand Charles, based on the life of Charles de Gaulle.

Ryall appeared in the BBC One sitcom Outnumbered from 2007 to 2011, in which he played Frank (known as "Grandad"), a character who suffers from dementia. The character appeared in series 1 and 2. Ryall reprised his role in the Christmas specials in 2009 and 2011. On 26 December 2016 the Christmas special was dedicated to his memory.

In 2010, Ryall portrayed Elphias Doge in Harry Potter and the Deathly Hallows – Part 1.

Ryall appeared as Dr Rant in the BBC One adaptation of the M.R. James ghost story The Tractate Middoth as part of the 2013 edition of A Ghost Story for Christmas. He also appeared briefly in 2013 as an old soldier in the BBC Drama Our Girl starring Lacey Turner, and he was cast in the BBC Drama The Village, as Old Bert, Britain's oldest man who recounts his long life through a series of flashbacks.

Ryall's last appearance was in Call the Midwife, where he played Tommy Mills. This episode was aired on BBC One on 1 March 2015 and was dedicated to his memory in the closing credits.

Personal life
Ryall had one son and two daughters: Jonathan Ryall (born 1966), who was the manager of the Australian band Glide; Imogen Ryall (born 1967), who is a singer and Charlie Ryall (born 1986), who is also an actor.

Ryall died on 25 December 2014 aged 79.

Filmography

The Dance of Death (1969) – Sentry
Black Joy (1977) – Butcher
Love for Lydia (1977, TV Series) – Bretherton
Enemy at the Door (1978-1980, TV Series) - Capt. Tom Foster-Smythe
Bless Me, Father (1978–1981, TV Series) – Billy Buzzle
The Knowledge (1979) – Titanic
The Elephant Man (1980) – Man With Whores
Fords on Water (1983) – Mister Jack
Jack the Ripper (1988, TV Series) – Bowyer
The Woman in Black (1989) – Sweetman
Wilt (1990) – Rev. Froude
Truly, Madly, Deeply (1990) – George
The Russia House (1990) – Colonial Type
Shelley (1990-1992, TV Series) – Ted Bishop
Shuttlecock (1993) – Pound
Justice (1993) – English Minister
Black Beauty (1994) – Carriagemaker
Giorgino (1994) – Professor Beaumont
Carrington (1995) – Mayor
Restoration (1995) – Lord Bathurst
Mad Cows (1999) – Man outside Harrods
Unconditional Love (2002) – Funeral Director
Two Men Went to War (2002) – Winston Churchill
Blackball (2003) – Giles Wilton
Around the World in 80 Days (2004) – Lord Salisbury
The League of Gentlemen's Apocalypse (2005) – Tom Tit
Doc Martin ep.  - "Happily Ever After" (2007) - Drunk Vicar
City of Ember (2008) – Chief Builder
Harry Potter and the Deathly Hallows – Part 1 (2010) – Elphias Doge
Hysteria (2011) – Judge
Trollied (2011–2012, TV series) – Vic
Quartet (2012) – Harry
A Ghost Story for Christmas: The Tractate Middoth (2013) – Dr. Rant
Mr. Turner (2014) – Footman
Autómata (2014) – Dominic Hawk
Call the Midwife (2015, series 4, episode 7) – Tommy Mills (final appearance)

References

External links

1935 births
2014 deaths
Alumni of RADA
English male film actors
English male television actors
20th-century English male actors
21st-century English male actors
People from Shoreham-by-Sea